Eriguthi is a small village in Gudiyattam taluk, Vellore district, Tamil Nadu, India. It lies between Gudiyattam and Pernambut, in a mountainous and forested region. Telugu and Tamil are its main languages.

The village is based on agriculture and Beedi (cigarettes made of tobacco leaves), but the land is so infertile that many farmers have migrated elsewhere.

Villages in Vellore district